The British International School Shanghai is an international school in Shanghai, China and is part of the Nord Anglia Education family of schools. There were two campuses originally with the Nord Anglia International School Shanghai Pudong opening in 2002 and the Puxi Campus in 2004. In 2015, the Pudong campus became the Nord Anglia International School Shanghai with The British International School Shanghai, Puxi retaining its original name.

Establishment 

The school was founded in 2002 by Nord Anglia Education. Nord Anglia Education operates 42 international schools worldwide in Asia, Europe, the Middle East and America. These independent international schools teach over 34,000 pupils worldwide.

Curriculum 

The school follows the National Curriculum of England and Wales, the General Certificate of Secondary Education and at post 16, the IB Diploma Programme.

Beyond the classroom 

The British International School Community Activity Programme (BISCAP)  held at the Puxi campus is an additional programme which brings in external expert coaches to run early morning, after school, evening and weekend sessions in music, sport, art and drama.

Community 

The Puxi campus has a Parent Teacher Association (PTA) which organizes a lot of social events during the school year including the annual Welcome Back Party, the Christmas Fair and the International Food Evening. They also have a New Parent Programme which organizes events and information sessions for new families to the school.

The school's Room Parent network is a popular way for parents to get involved in school life, with one Room Parent responsible for one particular class. Room Parents provide information to the parents from the class teacher. They also help to organise volunteers needed for reading, as well as helping to arrange coffee mornings or other activities for parents to socialise and get to know one another.

Puxi campus 

The Puxi Campus was established in 2004. It grew quickly and a new secondary building was opened on a nearby site in 2008. This was followed by a new secondary campus, built alongside the original school building, which was opened in 2011.

The campus is located in the Puxi side of Shanghai, in the heart of the Huacao area, a popular expat residential area. It is located close to the Hongqiao transportation hub, which provides a gateway to many other parts of the region.

Facilities include
Specialist classrooms for Early Years, primary and secondary students
Music technology suites and recording studios
Music practice rooms
Primary and secondary science laboratories
Black box drama studio 
Two large capacity theatres 
Primary and Secondary Learning Resource Centres
Large and small indoor gyms
6 Tennis courts
25 metre swimming pool in secondary
Smaller primary swimming pool
Full size football pitch and athletics track
Rugby grade astro-turf pitch
Age appropriate outside play areas for younger children

References

External links
 BISS Puxi Campus
BISS Puxi school profile on Time Out Shanghai Family

See also
 List of international schools in Shanghai
 List of international schools

Schools in Shanghai
Shanghai
International Baccalaureate schools in China
Educational institutions established in 2002
Private schools in Shanghai
2002 establishments in China
Nord Anglia Education